The 2019 Copa CONMEBOL Libertadores Femenina was the 11th edition of the CONMEBOL Libertadores Femenina (also referred to as the Copa Libertadores Femenina), South America's premier women's club football tournament organized by CONMEBOL. The tournament was held in Quito, Ecuador from 11 to 28 October 2019.

The final originally scheduled for 27 October 2019 was rescheduled to 28 October 2019 due to a series of protests and riots in Ecuador. The final was played between the Brazilian teams Corinthians and Ferroviária, being the first final played between teams from the same country. Corinthians defeated Ferroviária 2–0 to win their second tournament title.

Atlético Huila were the defending champions, but were eliminated in the quarter-finals by Ferroviária.

During the tournament, Mariana Larroquette (UAI Urquiza) scored against Municipal de Majes (64th minute, Group D) the 1000th goal of Copa Libertadores Femenina history.

Format changes
Starting from this season, the tournament was expanded from 12 to 16 teams.

For the group stage, the 16 teams were drawn into four groups. Teams in each group played one another in a round-robin basis, with the top two teams of each group advancing to the quarter-finals. Starting from the quarter-finals, the teams played a single-elimination tournament.

Teams
The 16 teams were:
the champions of all ten CONMEBOL associations
the title holders
an additional team from the host association
four additional teams from associations with the best historical performance in the tournament (Brazil, Chile, Colombia and Paraguay).

Notes

Venues
Matches were played in Quito. The stadiums were:
Estadio Olímpico Atahualpa (capacity: 35,742)
Estadio Rodrigo Paz Delgado (capacity: 41,575)

Draw
The draw for the tournament was held on 30 September 2019, 16:00 ECT (UTC−5), at the Mercure Hotel Alameda Quito in Quito. The 16 teams were drawn into four groups of four containing a team from each of the four pots. The defending champions Atlético Huila and the Ecuadorian champions Deportivo Cuenca were automatically seeded into Pot 1 and allocated to positions A1 and B1, respectively, in the group stage. The Colombian champions América were automatically seeded into Pot 3, while the four additional teams from associations with the best historical performance were automatically seeded into Pot 4. The remaining teams were seeded based on the results of their association in the 2018 Copa Libertadores Femenina. Teams from the same association could not be drawn into the same group.

2019 Ecuadorian protests

One week before the beginning of the tournament, various protests began in Ecuador after the government announced an end to fuel subsidies as part of public spending cuts agreed with the IMF in return for a loan. On 12 October 2019, two days into the tournament, none of the scheduled Group C and Group D matches were played due to security concerns caused by the protests. The Ecuadorian government and leaders representing the Andean nation's indigenous peoples reached an agreement on 13 October 2019 to repeal the decree that eliminated fuel subsidies. CONMEBOL later announced the competition would be resumed on 14 October 2019 with a modified schedule.

Finally, the group stage was extended from 18 to 19 October, the quarter-finals were rescheduled from 20 and 21 to 21 and 22 October, semi-finals from 23 and 24 to 24 and 25 October and the final and third place match from 27 to 28 October.

Group stage
Four matches were played on opening day but CONMEBOL suspended the four games scheduled for 12 October 2019 due to security concerns caused by a civil unrest. CONMEBOL later announced the competition would be resumed on 14 October 2017 with a modified schedule.

In the group stage, the teams were ranked according to points (3 points for a win, 1 point for a draw, 0 points for a loss). If tied on points, tiebreakers would be applied in the following order (Regulations Article 21).
Goal difference;
Goals scored;
Head-to-head result in games between tied teams;
Number of red cards;
Number of yellow cards;
Drawing of lots.

The winners and runners-up of each group advanced to the quarter-finals.

All times are local, ECT (UTC−5).

Group A

Group B

Group C

Group D

Final stages
Starting from the quarter-finals, the teams played a single-elimination tournament. If tied after full time, extra time would not be played, and the penalty shoot-out would be used to determine the winners (Regulations Article 23).

Bracket

Quarter-finals

Semi-finals

Third place match

Final
Luana Sartório (Ferroviária) and Ingryd (Corinthians), sent off and booked in the semi-finals respectively, were suspended and could not play in the final.

Top goalscorers

Broadcasting
  DAZN
  CDF
  Vera+

Elsewhere in South America and other countries, the matches were broadcast through the official CONMEBOL Libertadores pages on Facebook and YouTube.

See also
2019–20 UEFA Women's Champions League
2019 AFC Women's Club Championship

References

External links
CONMEBOL Libertadores Femenina Ecuador 2019, CONMEBOL

2019
2019 in women's association football
2019 in South American football
2019 in Ecuadorian football
Sports competitions in Quito
International club association football competitions hosted by Ecuador
October 2019 sports events in South America